Princess Latavri was a Georgian princess of the Bagrationi dynasty of Tao-Klarjeti branch.

She was a daughter of Adarnase I of Tao-Klarjeti and sister of King Ashot I of Iberia.

She married Prince Juansher, son of Prince Archil of Kakheti.

Juansher’s mother was initially opposed to the marriage. According to the chronicle:

References 

Bagrationi dynasty of Tao-Klarjeti
8th-century births
Year of death missing